"Gardenia" is a song by American musician Iggy Pop. It was released as the lead single from his 17th studio album, Post Pop Depression (2016), on January 22, 2016. The song was premiered live on The Late Show with Stephen Colbert on the day of the song's release. The song received positive reception from music critics and peaked at number 136 on the French Singles Chart and number 26 on the Billboard Adult Alternative Songs chart.

Critical reception
Evan Minsker of Pitchfork awarded "Gardenia" the site's "Best New Track" tag, commenting that "'Gardenia' is partially hypnotic thanks to the dreamy, trembling guitar drone, which sounds like something off mbv. His voice, ever the weighty and authoritative instrument, is given space to exist on its own, which is important for his poetry here. He's always exuded this dual nature of being absolutely charming—smiling, genteel—but behind those kind eyes is the former junkie slimeball that rolled around in glass. Both personalities are key to this song." Tom Breihan of Stereogum complimented the song and compared it to Pop's older works; "'Gardenia' has the same sort of mean, skeletal, machinelike groove that so many of those great old Iggy songs had."

Track listing
 Loma Vista — LVR-39548-02

Personnel
Personnel adapted from Post Pop Depression liner notes.
 Iggy Pop — vocals
 Josh Homme — guitar, production, slide guitar, synthesizer, vocals
 Dean Fertita — bass, Moog synthesizer, piano
 Matt Helders — drums

Charts

References

2016 singles
2016 songs
Iggy Pop songs
Songs written by Josh Homme
Songs written by Iggy Pop